The plain snake eel (Ophichthus unicolor) is an eel in the family Ophichthidae (worm/snake eels). It was described by Charles Tate Regan in 1908. It is a marine, subtropical eel which is known from Algoa Bay, South Africa, in the southeastern Atlantic Ocean.

References

Taxa named by Charles Tate Regan
Fish described in 1908
Ophichthus